After the Future is a documentary film by André Krummel. It premiered on 31 October 2017 as part of the 60th DOK Leipzig in Germany.

Film Content 
The documentary explores the private and professional life of HIV-positive human rights activist Ortwin Passon. More than twenty years has passed since the AIDS related death of his boyfriend. Passon himself, however, is still alive - against his own expectations. The film investigates several philosophical and legal themes while following Passon in his normal life volunteering at Germany’s Federal Agency for Technical Relief as well as attending bareback sex parties. The connection between his private and his professional life becomes obvious, when Ortwin meets his doctoral adviser to work on a Doctoral Thesis about barebacking as a basic human right - the right of HIV positive men to have unprotected anal sex.

Production 
The film is a production by the Filmakademie Baden-Württemberg and was made during André Krummel's third year at film school. Krummel met Passon by chance in a café in 2013. Shooting took place the following three years in a team of two together with Krummel’s assistant director and sound recordist Erik Lemke.

Reception 
Christian Eichler from the German internet radio and podcast label Detektor.fm says André Krummel uses the film to draw a sensitive portrait with many unanswered questions. The film has been marked as controversial due to scenes of a sexual nature and explicit drug use. The documentary received further positive press from the online magazine Berliner Filmfestivals, stating that the film remained "very close" to the protagonist and makes an "important contribution to the discussion of sexual morality and perversion."

Awards 
After the Future premiered at DOK Leipzig in 2017 and received an Honorary Mention in the German Competition for Long Documentary and Animated Film Award. It was further nominated for several awards, including the ver.di Prize for Solidarity, Humanity and Fairness and the DEFA Sponsoring Award.

References

External links 
 After the Future – official website 
 After the Future on Crew United (german) 
 
 After the Future on Filmotor.com

2017 documentary films